Glimåkra is a locality situated in Östra Göinge Municipality, Scania County, Sweden with 1,383 inhabitants in 2010.

References 

Populated places in Östra Göinge Municipality
Populated places in Skåne County